Paolo Carbonaro (born 16 February 1989) is an Italian footballer who plays as a forward for Trapani.

Club career
Born in Palermo, Carbonaro is a product of Palermo's youth system. He made his Serie A debut on 18 May 2008, substituting Boško Janković in the 79th minute in the rosanero's final 2007–08 league game against Siena. Both team failed to score more goal afterward and ended as a 2–2 draw.

He was loaned at Lega Pro Seconda Divisione club Monopoli on 1 September 2008. On 18 July 2009, he was loaned to Giulianova.

Barletta and Gela
On 30 July 2010, he was loaned to Barletta. Originally one of the starting striker in a 4–3–3 formation, he found himself out of the starting lineup after Arcangelo Sciannimanico chose to bet on experienced central forward Massimo Margiotta instead.

On 31 January 2011, Palermo announced Carbonaro would complete the 2010–11 season with Sicilian Lega Pro Prima Divisione club Gela.

In the summer 2011 he moved permanently to Giulianova. He started the 2012–13 season with Catanzaro, and then joined Lega Pro Seconda Divisione club HinterReggio during the January 2013 transfer window, being unable to save his team from relegation to Serie D. He stayed in the Seconda Divisione for the 2013–14 season, playing with Vigor Lamezia and Cosenza respectively. In August 2014 he joined Aversa Normanna of Lega Pro.

Serie D
In July 2019 he signed for Serie D club FC Messina. In June 2020, he extended for one more season his contract with the Sicilians.

On 3 August 2021 he moved to Cavese. He successively joined Acireale for the first half of the 2022–23 Serie D season, then leaving for Trapani later in December 2022.

International career
Carbonaro was also briefly part of the Italian under-19 and under-20 national teams.

References

External links
 
 La Gazzetta dello Sport profile 
 

1989 births
Living people
Footballers from Palermo
Association football forwards
Italian footballers
Serie A players
Serie C players
Serie D players
Palermo F.C. players
A.S.D. Barletta 1922 players
S.S.D. Città di Gela players
Giulianova Calcio players
U.S. Catanzaro 1929 players
Vigor Lamezia players
Cosenza Calcio players
S.S. Monopoli 1966 players
S.F. Aversa Normanna players
A.C. Monza players
Venezia F.C. players
S.S.D. F.C. Messina players
Cavese 1919 players